Kocahıdır is a village in İpsala district of Edirne Province, Turkey. The village is divided into three parts by two parallel creeks flowing to south west. The population of Kocahıdır was 1116 as of 2013. Kocahıdır was founded in 1893 by 66 Muslim families from Bulgaria. In 1938 during another migration, Muslim families from Romania were also settled in Kocahıdır. Between 1999 and the 2013 reorganisation, it was a town (belde).
Most important economic sector of the town is dairying.

References

Villages in İpsala District